Breaking Point is a 1989  American World War II thriller film directed  by Peter Markle and starring Corbin Bernsen, Joanna Pacuła and John Glover.

Plot 
A remake of the 1965 film 36 Hours, starring James Garner and Rod Taylor.

Cast  
 Corbin Bernsen as Pike
 Joanna Pacuła as Anna / Diana
 John Glover as Dr. Gerber
 David Marshall Grant as Osterman
 Lawrence Pressman as Gen. Smith
 Ken Jenkins as Col. Lowe
 Dennis Creaghan as Ungerland
 Joris Stuyck as Braga 
 Andrew Divoff as Aide 
 Kathryn Miller as Catherine
 Douglas Roberts as Dr. Johns
 John Alden as Abbot
 Alan Toy as Leroy

References

External links 

 

1989 thriller films
American thriller films
Films directed by Peter Markle
1980s English-language films
Films based on works by Roald Dahl
1980s American films